Dublin, Royal Irish Academy, MS 23 N 10, formerly Betham 145, is a Gaelic–Irish medieval manuscript.

Overview

MS 23 N 10 is a late sixteenth-century Irish manuscript currently housed in the Library of the Royal Irish Academy, Dublin. It was formerly in the possession of Sir William Betham (1779–1853).

The manuscript is highly valuable for its compilation of medieval Irish literature, copied in 1575 at Ballycumin, County Roscommon. The responsible scribes were Aodh, Dubhthach, and Torna, three scholars of the Ó Maolconaire (anglicised: O'Mulconry), a learned family also known for compiling Egerton 1782 (British Library) in 1517.

See also
 Ó Maolconaire
 Ollamh Síl Muireadaigh
 Ó Duibhgeannáin

Notes

Further reading

External links
"Manuscript Source Index 23 N 10 - Royal Irish Academy" Bibliography of Irish Linguistics and Literature. School of Celtic Studies, Dublin Institute for Advanced Studies.
"CODECS Manuscript Catalogue 23 N 10 (967) Royal Irish Academy, Dublin" Collaborative Online Database and e-Resources for Celtic Studies. A. G. van Hamel Foundation for Celtic Studies: Netherlands.
CELT: Corpus of Electronic Texts
Encoded manuscript G301033 in 
Encoded manuscript G100044 in  
Encoded manuscript G301032 in 

Irish manuscripts
Early Irish literature
Royal Irish Academy Library
Medieval literature